Bhajju Shyam (born 1971 in Patangarh, Central India, full name: Bhajju Singh Shyam) is an Indian artist, belonging to the Gond-Pardhaan community of Madhya Pradesh. He was awarded India's fourth highest civilian award the Padma Shri in 2018.

He was a contemporary of the celebrated Pardhaan artist Jangarh Singh Shyam and began his artistic career from Bharat Bhavan, Bhopal. He received international recognition for his book The London Jungle Book (Published By Tara Books in 2004), with which he made known throughout the world the Pardhaan Folk Art. 

According to art-historian and author, Jyotindra Jain, Bhajju Shyam was one of the most important and innovative artists to have emerged from the explosion of 'Gond-Pardhaan Painting' tradition spearheaded by Jangarh Singh Shyam.

For his book The Night Life of Trees (2006) he was awarded the 2008 Bologna Children's Book Fair. Bhajju Shyam lives in Bhopal, India.

References

Indian children's writers
1971 births
Living people
Indian children's book illustrators
People from Balangir
Writers from Odisha
Indian male writers
Recipients of the Padma Shri in arts
Public art in Mumbai